The Park Slope Jewish Center, known from 1942 to 1960 as Congregation B'nai Jacob - Tifereth Israel, is an egalitarian Conservative synagogue located at 1320 Eighth Avenue in South Slope, Brooklyn, New York City.  It was built in 1925 as the orthodox Congregation B'nai Jacob, and is a -story brick building with Romanesque and Baroque style elements. It features the Star of David on exterior masonry, a rose window, and a domed skylight.

The building was listed on the National Register of Historic Places in 2002.

A $1.75 million renovation and expansion was completed in 2015.  Rabbi Carie Carter has served the congregation since 2000.

References
Notes

External links

Park Slope Jewish Center website

Synagogues completed in 1925
Properties of religious function on the National Register of Historic Places in Brooklyn
Synagogues in Brooklyn
Conservative synagogues in New York City
Synagogues on the National Register of Historic Places in New York City
Romanesque Revival synagogues